Coptosoma xanthogramma is a species of true bugs belonging to the family Plataspidae and sub-order Heteroptera. It is commonly known as the black stink bug.

It is endemic to Asia and has been found on Luzon in the Philippines, Oahu in Hawaii, Guam and Iwo Jima, Volcano Islands. It is an invasive pest, feeding on legumes and similar plants.

References 

Insects described in 1884
Insects of the Philippines
Shield bugs